Box Spring Creek is a stream in the U.S. state of South Dakota.

Box Spring Creek was named for the fact someone found an old spring there.

See also
List of rivers of South Dakota

References

Rivers of Perkins County, South Dakota
Rivers of South Dakota